Badle Ki Aag ( Flames of Revenge) is a 1982 Hindi-language action thriller film, produced and directed by Rajkumar Kohli under the Shankar Movies banner. It stars Sunil Dutt, Dharmendra, Jeetendra, Reena Roy, Smita Patil and music was composed by Laxmikant–Pyarelal. Badle Ki Aag was a box-office success.

Plot
The story begins one Diwali night, the lamps of joy were burning in all homes. But in one home there were no lamps of joy; only the splattering of blood as the deceitful Raja Saheb (Kader Khan) of that place, greedy to swallow up all the property and wealth of his partner Kishorilal (Murad), went on a rampage of mass murder and wiped out the entire family and from this splattering of blood was born the Badle Ki Aag, the burning desire of revenge.

Revolted by the cruelty of her husband and unable to live even a single moment under the same roof with this mass-murderer, Raja Saheb's wife Durga (Nirupa Roy) collected her little children and fled into the darkness, far from the sinful and blood-stained world of her husband and fate played a game with her. Fate separated her from her children. Circumstances forced two brothers into the world of crime; it made dacoits out of Shera (Dharmendra) and Lakhan (Sunil Dutt). Both were brothers, children of Durga separated in childhood, both with the same blood in their veins, but unaware of each other's identities. Shera was ruthless, he grabbed everything he coveted, as though everything belonged to him, by right. Lakhan, on the other hand, was the champion of the poor. He too grabbed, but in order to provide for the poor and the helpless.

Geeta (Reena Roy), daughter of Kishorilal had survived the mass-murder. She too grew up nursing the burning desire for revenge in her heart. In time, she met and fell in love with the Inspector of Police Amar (Jeetendra) son of one of the murderers Mohanlal (Madan Puri), an associate of Raja Saheb. The burning desire to take revenge against the Raja Saheb and his associate for wiping out her entire family was the main force in her life, that, and her longing to find her long-lost brother Suraj (Rajiv Anand) who loved Asha (Sarika), the sister of the two dacoits, Shera, and Lakhan. Shera was crazy after Geeta, and Bijli (Smita Patil), a fiery young woman of his own band of dacoits, was crazy after Shera.

After a failed attempt by Geeta to kill Raja Saheb, Shera kidnaps her but is stopped by Lakhan. Fate flung Geeta into the arms of Lakhan, who starts living in his dacoit gang. After a series of events, Shera kidnaps Lakhan's mother, unaware that she is his own mother. Lakhan is arrested by Inspector Amar, but later escapes with Geeta's help.

Cast

Soundtrack

External links

References

1980s Hindi-language films
Films scored by Laxmikant–Pyarelal
1982 films
Indian action films